Tenggara means southeast in Malay languages (Malaysian and Indonesian). The term can be frequently found in topography (e.g., Southeast Asia: Asia Tenggara).

Malaysia
Bandar Tenggara
Indonesia
Nusa Tenggara, Southeast Islands or Lesser Sunda Islands
East Nusa Tenggara
West Nusa Tenggara
Sulawesi Tenggara

Indonesian words and phrases
Malay words and phrases